The Eau Claire Leader-Telegram (founded in 1881) is a newspaper published in Eau Claire, Wisconsin, by Adams Publishing Group. It is read throughout Eau Claire County and surrounding counties. As of 2013, the paper has a daily circulation of nearly 30,000 during the week and a circulation rate of nearly 40,000 for the Sunday paper. Adams Publishing acquired the Leader-Telegram from the Graaskamp and Atkinson families, which had owned the paper since 1887.

See also 
List of newspapers in Wisconsin

References

External links 

Eau Claire County, Wisconsin
Newspapers published in Wisconsin